Mingshan District, formerly Mingshan County, is a district of the city of Ya'an, Sichuan Province, China, located northeast of the city center.

Climate

References

Districts of Sichuan
Ya'an